The 2015 Bahia landslide occurred on 28 April 2015 in Salvador, Bahia, Brazil. The landslide killed at least 14 people.

References

Bahia landslide
2015 disasters in Brazil
Bahia landslide
History of Salvador, Bahia